Belenky is a rural locality (a khutor) in Bukanovskoye Rural Settlement, Kumylzhensky District, Volgograd Oblast, Russia. The population was 23 as of 2010.

Geography 
Belenky is located in forest plain, on Khopyorsko-Buzulukskaya Plain, 44 km southwest of Kumylzhenskaya (the district's administrative centre) by road. Andreyanovsky is the nearest rural locality.

References 

Rural localities in Kumylzhensky District